is a Japanese politician of the Liberal Democratic Party, a member of the House of Councillors in the National Diet (national legislature). A native of Iwaki, Fukushima and graduate of Sophia University with a B.L., he worked at Suntory and served in the city assembly of Iwaki for two terms since 1980, in the assembly of Fukushima Prefecture for two terms from 1986 and as mayor of Iwaki for two terms from 1990. He was elected to the House of Councillors for the first time in 1998.

Iwaki was named Minister of Justice in Shinzo Abe cabinet on 7 October 2015.

Conservative views 
Iwaki is a member of the Sinseiren parliamentary group (fundamentalist Shinto).

On 18 October 2015, a few days after joining Shinzo Abe's cabinet, Iwaki visited the controversial Yasukuni Shrine.

References 

 

1949 births
Liberal Democratic Party (Japan) politicians
Living people
Politicians from Fukushima Prefecture
Mayors of places in Japan
Members of the House of Councillors (Japan)
Sophia University alumni